The 3201 or Stella Class was a class of standard gauge  steam locomotive, designed by William Dean and built at Swindon Works for the Great Western Railway in 1884 and 1885.

Design
They were part of a standardisation scheme of Dean's, whereby he designed four classes with similar boilers, double frames, and cylinders, but of different wheel layouts. The 3201 class was close in design to the 3501 Class, ten of which were built initially as  "convertibles" for the broad gauge, and numbers 3511 to 3520 built as standard gauge condensing s.

Construction
Initially there were 5 members of the class. The prototype, No.3201, built in December 1884, was immediately sold to the Pembroke and Tenby Railway, who named it Stella. It returned to the GWR in 1896 and retained the nameplates until 1902. Nos. 3202-3205 were constructed in the summer of 1885. Between 1892 and 1895 the class was enlarged to 25 locomotives, as the  broad and standard gauge 2-4-0Ts were all eventually converted to standard gauge tender locomotives. Tabor notes that "... the uniformity was very short-lived, as the class soon acquired a remarkable variety of boilers."

Use
The original Stellas worked in the Bristol division but after the gauge conversion of 1892 all 25 locos were dispatched to Cornwall, where they worked the principal trains west of Newton Abbot until the arrival a few years later of the 3252 or Duke Class. The class then became widely dispersed; by 1915 many were at Chester or Croes Newydd, others at Birmingham or Stourbridge. Later some went to central Wales. Withdrawals took place between 1919 and 1933.

References

3201
2-4-0 locomotives
2-4-0T locomotives
Standard gauge steam locomotives of Great Britain
Railway locomotives introduced in 1884
Scrapped locomotives
Passenger locomotives